Raphaël Diarra (born 27 May 1995) is a French professional footballer who plays as a defender for Championnat National team Borgo.

Diarra is a youth exponent from AS Monaco and has played for Cercle Brugge, US Quevilly-Rouen and Ashdod before signing for Oldham. He has played in the Europa League and been capped at a youth level for France.

Personal life 
Diarra was born in Paris and is of Malian descent. He is a devout muslim.

Club career

Monaco 
Diarra came through the youth ranks of AS Monaco and was placed into the B team. He played his first game for the B team in October 2013, in a 2–0 win against Martigues. He established himself as a regular starter for Monaco B and eventually he scored his first goal in November 2014, against Rodez. Diarra made his debut for Monaco on 10 December 2015, in a UEFA Europa League game. He replaced Bernardo Silva after 65 minutes in a 4–1 away defeat against Tottenham Hotspur. After his loan spell with Cercle Brugge, he continued playing for Monaco B.

Cercle Brugge (loan) 
On 31 August 2016, Diarra joined Belgian side, Cercle Brugge, on loan, until the end of the 2016–17 season. He played in 15 games, including a 3–1 win against Tubize, in which Diarra scored his second ever professional goal. In his last game for Cercle Brugge, Diarra was given two yellow cards and subsequently sent off as a result.

Ashdod 
After spending another season with Monaco B, Diarra was sold to Israeli side, Ashdod. Diarra made no league appearance during his tenure but he was subbed on with 9 minutes remaining in a Toto Cup Ligat Al game against Hapoel Hadera. He made no other appearances for Ashdod.

US Quevilly-Rouen 
After a disappointing season with Ashdod, Diarra returned to France, where he joined US Quevilly-Rouen. He played one game for Quevilly B, which was a 1–1 draw against Pacy Ménilles. He made his debut for the first team a week later, in a 1–0 loss against Chambly Oise. Through his two years with the National 1 outfit, Diarra made 31 league appearances, as well as three cup appearances.

Oldham 
On November 10, 2020, he signed for Oldham Athletic until June 2021. He made his debut on the same day, in a 3–1 win to Bradford City. In his first season, Diarra started in 16 league games and solidified his position in the team. He also partook in three cup games. Manager Harry Kewell utilised Diarra as both a midfielder and a defender throughout the season. On 12 March 2021, Oldham exercised an extension on Diarra's contract to keep him on for another season. Following the club's relegation to the National League, Diarra was released at the end of the 2021–22 season.

International career 
Diarra could play for the Mali National Team or the France national U-21 team. Between 2013-2015, Diarra has been capped, at a youth level, a total of 8 times for France. At the time, Diarra was involved in the winner squad of the World Youth Festival Toulon.

Career Statistics

References

External links
 
 

1995 births
French people of Malian descent
Footballers from Paris
French Muslims
Living people
French footballers
France youth international footballers
Association football defenders
AS Monaco FC players
Cercle Brugge K.S.V. players
US Quevilly-Rouen Métropole players
Oldham Athletic A.F.C. players
FC Bastia-Borgo players
Championnat National 2 players
Challenger Pro League players
Championnat National 3 players
Championnat National players
English Football League players
French expatriate footballers
French expatriate sportspeople in Monaco
Expatriate footballers in Monaco
French expatriate sportspeople in Belgium
Expatriate footballers in Belgium
French expatriate sportspeople in England
Expatriate footballers in England